Luna, el misterio de Calenda is a Spanish mystery and horror television series. Produced by Globomedia for Antena 3, it aired from 2012 to 2013 on the latter channel.

Premise 
Sara (Belén Rueda), a judge, moves with her teenage daughter Leire (Lucía Guerrero) to a remote mountain village seeking to resume her marriage with Diego Costa (Leonardo Sbaraglia), a law enforcement officer who after ten years separated from Sara has reportedly installed in the area. But David disappears. Upon her arrival to Calenda, Sara finds out the mystery around the village is connected to gruesome legends, some of them related to lycanthropy.

Meanwhile, Leire feels attracted to the mysterious Joel (Álvaro Cervantes) and also becomes a close friend of Vera (Macarena García), herself infatuated by Nacho (Fran Perea) a Guardia Civil officer several years her senior.

Cast 
 Belén Rueda as Sara Cruz, a judge.
  as Leire (Sara's daughter).
 Álvaro Cervantes as Joel.
 Macarena García as Vera, Carola's daughter.
 Daniel Grao as Raúl Pando, a Guardia Civil agent, married to Carola.
 Fran Perea as Nacho, a Guardia Civil agent.
 Olivia Molina as Olivia, the court clerk.
 Belén López as Carola, the village's bar owner.
  as Joel's father.
  as Pablo, Vera's brother.
 Claudia Traisac as Silvia Elías, the Mayor's daughter.
  as Francisco Elías, Mayor of Calenda, Manuel and Silvia's father.
 Leonardo Sbaraglia as David Costa, Sara's husband.
  as Sonia, a rookie police officer.
  as Basilio.
 Carlos Cuevas as Tomás, Olivia's son.
  as Gerardo, the janitor of the high school.
 Daniel Ortiz as Salva, a high school teacher.

Introduced in season 2
 Roberto Álamo as Diego, Vera and Pablo's biological father.
 Estefanía de los Santos as Marcela, a neighbor of Calenda.
 Álvaro de Luna as Ernesto Cruz, Sara's father.
 , a troubling teenager.

Production and release 
The series was shot in a  1,300 m2 indoor set, with outdoor scenes primarily shot in Candelario (province of Salamaca), and additional outdoor shooting locations in Las Navas del Marqués (province of Ávila), and a forest in the province of Segovia. The first season consisted of 12 episodes.

The series premiered on 10 April 2012. The series returned with an 8-episode second season on 13 February 2013. The non-renovation of the series for a third season was determined before airing finished. The season finale aired on 10 April 2013.

Season 1

Season 2

References 

2010s Spanish drama television series
Spanish mystery television series
Spanish fantasy television series
2012 Spanish television series debuts
2013 Spanish television series endings
Television shows filmed in Spain
Television series about werewolves
Antena 3 (Spanish TV channel) network series
Spanish horror fiction television series
2010s supernatural television series
Television series by Globomedia